Faika El-Nagashi or Faika Anna El-Nagashi (born 3 September 1976) is an Austrian politician from the Austrian Green Party. Since 2015 she has sat on the Gemeinderat and Landtag of Vienna.

Early life
El-Nagashi was born in 1976 in Budapest with a Hungarian and Egyptian heritage. She spent her childhood in the area of Vienna known as Simmering before attending the University of Vienna in 2003 to study Political Science. She completed her course in 2009 having written about migrant sex workers. In 2004 she became active in general in human rights relating to Eastern Europe and the European Community. She has represented the rights of sex-workers.

Political career

On 24 November 2015 she became a Green Party councillor in Vienna and a member of the Vienna Provincial Parliament.

Personal life
El-Nagashi is openly Lesbian. In October 2017, she spoke alongside Ulrike Lunacek and Phyll Opoku-Gyimah and the opening speech of the first European Lesbian* Conference in Vienna.

References

1976 births
Living people
Hungarian emigrants to Austria
Austrian women in politics
Politicians from Vienna
Austrian LGBT rights activists
Austrian LGBT politicians
Lesbian politicians
LGBT legislators